Luigi Grimani (died 1656) was a Roman Catholic prelate who served as Bishop of Bergamo (1633–1656).

Biography
On 12 Jan 1633, Luigi Grimani was appointed during the papacy of Pope Urban VIII as Bishop of Bergamo.
He served as Bishop of Bergamo until his death on 4 Dec 1656.

References

External links and additional sources
 (for Chronology of Bishops) 
 (for Chronology of Bishops) 

17th-century Roman Catholic bishops in the Republic of Venice
Bishops appointed by Pope Urban VIII
1656 deaths